Children of the Corn: Revelation is a 2001 American slasher horror film directed by Guy Magar. It is the seventh installment of the Children of the Corn film series. The plot follows a woman who travels to Omaha, Nebraska in search of her grandmother, and finds her apartment building to be overrun with mysterious children who seem to be emerging from the adjacent corn field.

Plot
Jamie Lowell (Claudette Mink) comes to Omaha, Nebraska after numerous phone calls to her grandmother have gone unanswered. Her grandmother's apartment building, which is built next to a cornfield, appears to be empty, except for two young, mysterious children who roam about. Jamie discovers that her grandmother has received a notice of eviction. She goes to see Det. Armbrister, who is not much help. While at the local grocery store, Jamie has an encounter with the children from the building, but they do not speak to her. Outside, she sees a priest standing in the street, staring at her. She returns to her grandmother's apartment to discover a message: "Jamie go home".

Jamie questions the building manager, Jerry Ulrich who is of no help. Jamie investigates in the basement and finds a crop of carrots and tomatoes. She flees when she hears a group of children laughing. She runs into a man with a gun, who tells her to keep out of the basement. She later meets two more tenants, an old man in a wheelchair who swears at everyone and a young woman named Tiffany (Crystal Lowe), a stripper. Jerry invites Jamie to a BBQ on the roof, she agrees. On the roof, Jerry takes a bite of corn and discovers there is blood inside. He is then shoved off the roof by the two children. When Jamie arrives, he is nowhere to be found, and she sees the priest watching her from the ground.

Jamie has a nightmare in which her grandmother was lured from her house by a strange voice to railroad tracks. The next day, Jamie goes to see Det. Armbrister who reveals Jamie's grandmother was part of a religious cult when she was a child. The kids, who were led by a boy-preacher named Abel, committed suicide by entering a tent and setting it ablaze. Only Jamie's grandmother survived. Jamie's grandmother's apartment is built upon the site of the fire. This is ironic, because Jamie's parents were killed in a house fire.

Tiffany returns home and, while taking a bath, she is attacked by one of the children who uses corn to strangle her, before taking her body. Det. Armbrister and Jamie arrive at the apartment, but don't notice Tiffany's body lying nearby in the cornfield. Later, after Det. Armbrister leaves, the old man in the wheelchair is attacked by the kids and is pushed through a stair balcony and falls to his death.

Jamie returns to the grocery store, which is ransacked. She spots a girl wearing her grandmother's hat and chases after her, failing to notice the storeowner's severed head inside a drink cooler. Jamie returns to the apartment, where she runs into the man with the gun. He reveals that everyone else has disappeared and that he is leaving. As he makes his escape, the kids trap him in an elevator and scare him so much, that he has a heart attack and dies. The kids then drag off his body.

The priest arrives and explains about Gatlin, and He Who Walks Behind the Rows, who is apparently the devil. The priest tells Jamie that her grandmother is dead and that if she does not leave, she too will be killed. The priest then leaves. Some of the children arrive and take Jamie down to the basement, where there are now rows of corn growing. Abel appears and the children close in on her. One of the children reveals herself to be Jamie's grandmother and though she is a child, speaks in the voice of an old woman. Jamie flees, but Abel uses his power to prevent her from leaving. Cornered, Jamie faces Abel and the children, who ask her to join them. Jamie agrees, but it is only a distraction and she causes a gas explosion, but Abel is unscathed.

Abel uses corn stalks to tie down Jamie, but she is rescued by Det. Armbrister. They both manage to escape before the apartment explodes and destroys the corn as well. It is implied that the souls of the children were freed and Abel was killed.

Cast
 Claudette Mink as Jamie Lowell 
 Kyle Cassie as Detective Armbrister
 Troy Yorke as Jerry Ulrich
 Michael Rogers as Stan
 Crystal Lowe as Tiffany
 Michael Ironside as The Priest
 Sean Smith as Boy Preacher Abel
 Jeff Ballard as Boy #1
 Taylor Hobbs as Girl #1

Reception
Adam Tyner of DVD Talk rated it 2/5 stars and wrote: "Director Guy Magar took the traditional no-budget, direct-to-video, paint-by-numbers approach, resulting in an uninvolving, unremarkable film that doesn't offer even the most fleeting glimpse of terror or suspense". Total Film ranked it number 49 out of 50 in their list of Stephen King adaptations.

Film scholar Mark Browning noted the film's employment of several "macabre" images and praised its cinematography, but wrote that "inconsistencies in the plot abound".

See also
 List of adaptations of works by Stephen King

References

Works cited

External links
 
 
 

Direct-to-video sequel films
2001 horror films
Children of Corn 7
Children of the Corn
Films about cults
Films about religion
American slasher films
Miramax films
Dimension Films films
Direct-to-video horror films
Films set in Nebraska
Films set in apartment buildings
2001 direct-to-video films
2001 films
Films produced by Joel Soisson
Films based on works by Stephen King
2000s English-language films
Films directed by Guy Magar
2000s American films